Johann Maier (15 May 1933 – 16 March 2019) was an Austrian scholar of Judaism, and was founder and, for thirty years, director of the Martin Buber Institute for Jewish Studies at the University of Cologne. He retired in 1996, and was living in Mittenwald, in Upper Bavaria.

Maier was appointed director of the Martin Buber Institute for Jewish Studies at its founding in Spring 1966. This was the second of three faculties of Jewish studies in Germany after the Free University of Berlin (1963, Prof Jacob Taube) and before the University of Frankfurt (1969, Prof. Arnold Goldberg).

Areas of research

Judaism and philosophy
Following on from the naming of the institute in Cologne after Martin Buber, one of Maier's principal areas of research was on the relationship between Jewish and general philosophy – such as Intellektualismus und Mystik als Faktoren jüdischer Selbstdefinition (1985) where Maier noted that question as to the existence of “Jewish” philosophy, and its essence forces the question as to the essence, identity, and continuity of Jewish culture.

Talmudic research
One of Johann Maier's notable areas of research is regarding the dating and origin of passages relating to Jesus in the Talmud. Many scholars, such as Joseph Klausner

Other works
 Maier, J. Judentum von A bis Z: Glauben, Geschichte, Kultur 2001
 Maier, J. Geschichte der jüdischen Religion Berlin 1972; Freiburg 1992
 Maier, J. Das Judentum Munich 1973 - one of the main reference works on Judaism in German.
 The Judaic System of the Dead Sea Scrolls in Jacob Neusner, ed., Judaism in Late Antiquity, 2, pp. 84–108. 2004
 Maier J, Die Kabbalah. 1995 - an introduction to Kabbalah.

He was the editor of Judentum und Umwelt.

References

Austrian biblical scholars
1933 births
2019 deaths